WRJY (104.1 FM) is a radio station broadcasting a country music format. Licensed to Brunswick, Georgia, United States, the station serves the Brunswick area.  The station is currently owned by Golden Isles Broadcasting, LLC and features programming from Motor Racing Network.

History
The station went on the air as WAAE on March 29, 1993. On August 20 that year, the station changed its call sign to WSEG, & then on June 11, 2003, to the current WRJY.

References

External links
Wave 104.1 official website

Golden Isles Broadcasting, LLC

RJY
Radio stations established in 1993
1993 establishments in Georgia (U.S. state)